is a Japanese blogging and social networking website.

In December 2009, Ameba launched Ameba Now, a micro-blogging platform competing with Twitter. In March 2009 Ameba launched Ameba Pico, a Facebook app for the English market based on the virtual community Ameba Pigg.

Ameba Pigg (PC version) 
Pigg is a Japanese blog virtual community in which users can customize an avatar, socialize with people around the world using replicas of landmarks around the world like Shibuya 109 and the Statue of Liberty.

Users can also decorate their own rooms with different types of furniture, bought with virtual currencies called "Gummies", "Tokens", and "Silver Coin". Users can and invite other players to their rooms and leave them messages.

For the English version, Gummies and Tokens are game currencies that are earned by doing in-game tasks such as ringing other people's rooms and giving the props, while "Candy Gold" is a currency in the game which users can only acquire by paying real money, Facebook Credits, Phone Balance, or by doing tasks from the game's providers like Paymentwall. Selected Items bought with Candy Gold can be alternatively purchased using tokens.

In early 2019, Ameba announced that the PC version of Pigg and related communities (Pigg Life, Pigg World, Pigg Brave, Pigg Cafe, and Pigg Island) would be shut down by December 2, 2019 due to the termination of Adobe Flash in 2020. They listed on their website three alternatives to Pigg (PC Version). One is a mobile browser version of Pigg, which can be also accessed by desktop computers, but features are limited compared to the original Flash game. In addition, Ameba created two mobile apps, Pigg Party and Pigg Life, which are more interactive and have a closer resemblance to their predecessor.

See also
AbemaTV

References

External links 

  
 Ameba Pigg (PC Version)
 

Virtual world communities
Japanese social networking websites
Internet properties established in 2004
2004 establishments in Japan
Microblogging services
CyberAgent
Ameba (website)